Ferenc Kersch (1853, in Bácsalmás – 1910, in Esztergom) was a Hungarian composer. He was a student of Liszt and teacher of Artúr Harmat.

Works, editions and recordings
 Stabat Mater
 Te Deum
 Vespers

Recordings
 Dextera Domini on Musica Sacra Hungarica Budapest Monteverdi Choir, Eva Kollar

References

BMC brief bio in Hungarian

Hungarian composers
Hungarian male composers
1853 births
1910 deaths
People from Bács-Kiskun County